Aidachi Attilah Aguero Aguilera (born ) is a Cuban female volleyball player. She is part of the Cuba women's national volleyball team.

She participated in the 2015 FIVB Volleyball World Grand Prix.
On club level she played for Camaguey in 2015.

References

External links
http://u18.women.2015.volleyball.fivb.com/en/competition/teams/cub-cuba/players/aidachi-attilah-aguero-aguilera?id=45060
http://u20.women.2015.volleyball.fivb.com/en/competition/teams/cub-cuba/players/aidachi-attilah-aguero-aguilera?id=45224
http://www.fivb.org/vis_web/volley/WU202015/WU202015_p3-028.pdf

1999 births
Living people
Cuban women's volleyball players
Place of birth missing (living people)
Wing spikers